This list is of the Cultural Properties of Japan designated in the category of  for the Prefecture of Nara.

National Cultural Properties
As of 1 July 2019, one hundred and sixty Important Cultural Properties have been designated (including eighteen *National Treasures), being of national significance.

Prefectural Cultural Properties
As of 1 April 2018, forty-three properties have been designated at a prefectural level.

Municipal Cultural Properties
Properties designated at a municipal level include:

See also
 Cultural Properties of Japan
 List of National Treasures of Japan (paintings)
 Japanese painting
 List of Historic Sites of Japan (Nara)
 List of Cultural Properties of Japan - historical materials (Nara)

References

External links
  Cultural Properties in Nara Prefecture
  Image Database of Historical Resources of the Nara Region

Cultural Properties,Nara
Cultural Properties,Paintings
Paintings,Nara
Lists of paintings